Magic Trip is a 2011 documentary film directed by Alison Ellwood and Alex Gibney, about Ken Kesey, Neal Cassady, and the Merry Pranksters.

The documentary uses the 16 mm color footage shot by Kesey and the Merry Pranksters during their 1964 cross-country bus trip in the Furthur bus. The hyperkinetic Cassady is frequently seen driving the bus, jabbering, and sitting next to a sign that boasts, "Neal gets things done".

The film was released in the US on August 5, 2011 by Magnolia Pictures.

The movie soundtrack includes excerpts from several songs by the Grateful Dead.

References

External links
 

2011 films
Documentary films about United States history
Hippie films
Films directed by Alex Gibney
Documentary films about drugs
2010s English-language films